Bolton Notch State Park is a public recreation area located in the town of Bolton, Connecticut, on the boundary between the Thames River and Connecticut River watersheds. The state park's  offer opportunities for hiking, climbing, and cave exploration.

History
Native Americans are believed to have used the major trails crossing through Bolton Notch, which they called Saqumsketuck, for at least 10,000 years. The notch is thought to have created the boundary between the Mohegan and Podunk territories. The park grounds include Squaw's Cave, where according to legend a European settler and his Podunk bride lived as outcasts around 1640. The state purchased the park's first 70 acres in 1918 in anticipation of developing a Wayside Park.

Activities and amenities
The park offers rock climbing and hiking as well as "several caves large enough to accommodate a human." It is crossed by both the Hop River Trail and Shenipsit Trail.

References

External links
Bolton Notch State Park Connecticut Department of Energy and Environmental Protection
Bolton Notch State Park Map Connecticut Department of Energy and Environmental Protection

State parks of Connecticut
Parks in Tolland County, Connecticut
Bolton, Connecticut
Protected areas established in 1918
1918 establishments in Connecticut